Bairds Mainfreight Primary School is a contributing primary school (years 0–6) in Otara, a suburb of Auckland Council, Auckland Region, New Zealand.

The trucking and logistics firm Mainfreight Limited has sponsored the school since 1993. The school benefits from this relationship due to the support Mainfreight gives to it in the area of Information and Communication Technologies, and Alan Duff's Duffy Books in Homes programme. Mainfreight's philosophy of "Anything is Possible" is one that fits with the educational philosophy of the school. In 1997 the school renamed itself from Bairds Primary School to its current name.

References

External links
 Community support of Bairds Mainfreight primary school
 Ero report (March 2006)

Primary schools in Auckland
Ōtara-Papatoetoe Local Board Area